The Old Medicine School of San Carlos (Spanish: Antigua Facultad de Medicina de San Carlos) is a building located in Madrid, Spain. It was declared Bien de Interés Cultural in 1997.

References 

Buildings and structures in Embajadores neighborhood, Madrid
Bien de Interés Cultural landmarks in Madrid